New Year is the time when a culture celebrates the end of one calendar year and the beginning of the next.

New Year, The New Year, or A New Year may also refer to:

New Year observances
 New Year's Eve, December 31 in the Gregorian and Julian calendars, date in other calendars vary
 New Year's Day, January 1 in the Gregorian and Julian calendars, date in other calendars vary
 Lunar New Year, the first day of a year whose months are coordinated by the cycles of the moon
 Chinese New Year
 Chinese New Year's Eve
 Islamic New Year (1 Muharram) 
 Japanese New Year (1/2/3 January)
 Nowruz, Iranian or Persian New Year, celebrated on the spring equinox

Film
 New Year (1924 film), a Chinese black-and-white animation by Cy Young
 New Year (1989 film), an Indian Malayalam-language film by Viji Thampi
 The New Year (film), a 2010 American comedy drama film by Brett Harley

Music
 The New Year (band), an American indie rock band formed in 1999
 New Year (opera), a 1989 opera by Michael Tippett

Albums
 The New Year (album), by the New Year, 2008
 New Year (EP), by A Silent Film, 2015

Songs
 "New Year" (song), by Sugababes, 2000
 "A New Year", by Annaleigh Ashford, 2016
 "The New Year" (song), by Death Cab for Cutie, 2004
 "New Year", by the Breeders from Last Splash, 1993
 "New Hear", by Regina Spektor from Remember Us to Life, 2016
 "New Year", by Six by Seven from The Closer You Get, 2000
 "New Year", by SVT, 1979

See also
 New Year Island (disambiguation)
 New Year picture, a popular Banhua in China
 New Year tree, decorations similar to Christmas trees
 New Year's (disambiguation)
 New Year's Day (disambiguation)
 New Year's Eve (disambiguation)
 New Year's resolution, a commitment that an individual makes
 Happy New Year (disambiguation)